Tire machèt ("pull [the] machete") is a Haitian martial art; a form of fencing with machetes.

The origin of the practice lies in the Haitian Revolution of 1791-1804, in which rebel slaves, many armed only with the machetes they had used to cut sugarcane, defeated the French colonial army. Tire machèt combines traditional African combat systems with elements of historical European fencing. It is traditionally practiced in secret.

Haitian master fencer Alfred Avril (d. 2014) was among the first to open up his practice to the world, through a 10-year collaboration with Reginald Turnier and Michael Dylan Rogers of the Haitian Machete Fencing Project. A 2014 documentary short film by Jonathan David Kane, Papa Machete, depicted Alfred Avril training his sons and other students.

References

Fencing in Haiti
North American martial arts
Martial arts in Haiti
Haitian culture